Douglas Ulmer is an American mathematician who works in algebraic geometry and number theory. He is a professor and mathematics department head at the University of Arizona.

Education 
Ulmer did his undergraduate study at Princeton University. In 1987, he received his PhD at Brown University, where his advisor was Benedict Hyman Gross; his thesis was titled The Arithmetic of Universal Elliptic Modular Curves.

Academic career 
Ulmer was a C. L. E. Moore instructor at the Massachusetts Institute of Technology in 1987. In 1997 he was among the founders of the Southwest Center for Arithmetic Geometry at the University of Arizona. In 2009, he moved to the Georgia Institute of Technology, where he became Chair of the School of Mathematics. He returned to the University of Arizona in 2017.

Since 2014, he has served on the editorial board of the Journal de Théorie des Nombres de Bordeaux.

References 

1960 births
Living people
20th-century American mathematicians
Princeton University alumni
Brown University alumni
Georgia Tech faculty
University of Arizona faculty
Massachusetts Institute of Technology School of Science faculty
21st-century American mathematicians